Ocotillo (Spanish for "Vine cactus") is a census-designated place (CDP) in Imperial County, California. It is part of the El Centro, California Metropolitan Statistical Area.

Ocotillo was devastated by floods from Hurricane Kathleen in 1976; 3 people died. There is a cafe, a church, a small park, a community center, a small market, two bars, OHV rentals and a gas station.  There is a Desert Museum with displays about the desert terrain, flora, etc. and artifacts from the Kumeyaay culture that inhabited the area which is located on the north side of Interstate 8.

Geography

History
Ocotillo is located on a site that originally sat on the edge of ancient Lake Cahuilla and is the traditional territory of the Kumeyaay. The town originated as a retirement community. The post office was opened in 1957. In March 2012, a museum, the Imperial Valley Desert Museum opened in Ocotillo after many years of fundraising and construction.

Demographics

2010
The 2010 United States Census reported that Ocotillo had a population of 266. The racial makeup of Ocotillo was 242 (91.0%) White, 1 (0.4%) African American, 1 (0.4%) Native American, 2 (0.8%) Asian, 0 (0.0%) Pacific Islander, 17 (6.4%) from other races, and 3 (1.1%) from two or more races. Hispanic or Latino of any race were 61 persons (22.9%).

The Census reported that 266 people (100% of the population) lived in households, 0 (0%) lived in non-institutionalized group quarters, and 0 (0%) were institutionalized.

There were 138 households, out of which 24 (17.4%) had children under the age of 18 living in them, 50 (36.2%) were opposite-sex married couples living together, 13 (9.4%) had a female householder with no husband present, 5 (3.6%) had a male householder with no wife present.  There were 3 (2.2%) unmarried opposite-sex partnerships, and 2 (1.4%) same-sex married couples or partnerships. 60 households (43.5%) were made up of individuals, and 25 (18.1%) had someone living alone who was 65 years of age or older. The average household size was 1.93.  There were 68 families (49.3% of all households); the average family size was 2.60.

The population was spread out, with 44 people (16.5%) under the age of 18, 9 people (3.4%) aged 18 to 24, 33 people (12.4%) aged 25 to 44, 109 people (41.0%) aged 45 to 64, and 71 people (26.7%) who were 65 years of age or older.  The median age was 56.1 years. For every 100 females, there were 111.1 males.  For every 100 females age 18 and over, there were 113.5 males.

The homeowner vacancy rate was 2.8%; the rental vacancy rate was 14.9%.  189 people (71.1% of the population) lived in owner-occupied housing units and 77 people (28.9%) lived in rental housing units.

2000
As of the census of 2000, there were 296 people, 145 households, and 79 families residing in the CDP. The racial makeup of the CDP was 87.8% White, 0.7% Black or African American, 1.7% Native American, 0.3% Asian, 0.3% Pacific Islander, 4.4% from other races, and 4.7% from two or more races.  19.9% of the population were Hispanic or Latino of any race.

There were 145 households, out of which 22.8% had children under the age of 18 living with them, 44.8% were married couples living together, 8.3% had a female householder with no husband present, and 45.5% were non-families. 42.1% of all households were made up of individuals, and 22.1% had someone living alone who was 65 years of age or older.  The average household size was 2.0 and the average family size was 2.8.

In the CDP, the population was spread out, with 21.6% under the age of 18, 3.7% from 18 to 24, 18.9% from 25 to 44, 32.1% from 45 to 64, and 23.6% who were 65 years of age or older.  The median age was 48 years. For every 100 females, there were 112.9 males.  For every 100 females age 18 and over, there were 100.0 males.

The median income for a household in the CDP was $23,438, and the median income for a family was $43,125. Males had a median income of $24,196 versus $55,556 for females. The per capita income for the CDP was $14,849.  None of the families and 16.6% of the population were living below the poverty line, including no under eighteens and 26.2% of those over 64.

Government

Utilities
Two nonprofit utilities provide water service to Ocotillo. Ocotillo Mutual Water Company provides service to the main part of the community and Coyote Valley Mutual Water Company provides service to outlying areas.

See also
 El Centro Metropolitan Area
 San Diego–Imperial, California

References

Populated places in the Colorado Desert
Census-designated places in Imperial County, California
Census-designated places in California